Juan Francisco Murillo Díaz, also known as "El Güero Jaibo" (Mexican Spanish slang: "Tampico Whitey"), was a member of the Tijuana Cartel (Arellano Félix Organization), believed to be one of the masterminds and shooters behind the assassination of Cardinal Juan Jesús Posadas Ocampo in Guadalajara, Jalisco, in May 1993. Although he was never arrested, Murillo was identified as the actual shooter, along with Édgar Nicolás Villegas, AKA "El Negro" (The Negro).

Murillo was killed in a shootout with judicial police in Sinaloa de Leyva, Sinaloa, in August 1993.

Other cartel members

Murillo's nephew, Ulises Murillo Mariscal, also a member of the Arellano Félix Organization, was arrested in 1994 at his home in Guadalajara, Jalisco, for possession of cocaine and several firearms.  Still at large and unidentified is Murillo's other nephew, known only as "El Tiburón" (The Shark).  He is believed to be living in the United States, in either  San Diego or Chula Vista, California.

In August 2006 the D.E.A. and U.S. Coast Guard captured the suspected leader of the Arellano Félix Organization, Francisco Javier Arellano Félix, AKA "El Tigrillo" (The Wildcat), along with his lieutenant Arturo Manuel Villareal Heredia, AKA "El Nalgón" (The One with Big Ass).

See also
Eduardo Arellano Félix
Francisco Javier Arellano Félix
Miguel Ángel Félix Gallardo

References

External links
Joaquín López Dóriga article on the murder of Ocampo (Spanish)

Year of birth missing
1993 deaths
Mexican assassins
Tijuana Cartel traffickers
Deaths by firearm in Mexico
People shot dead by law enforcement officers in Mexico